Global Mapper is a geographic information system (GIS) software package currently developed by Blue Marble Geographics that runs on Microsoft Windows. The GIS software competes with ESRI, GeoMedia, Manifold System, and MapInfo GIS products. Global Mapper handles both vector, raster, and elevation data, and provides viewing, conversion, and other general GIS features. Global Mapper has an active user community with a mailing list and online forums.

History
In 1995 the USGS was in need of a Windows viewer for their data products, so they developed the dlgv32 application for viewing their DLG (Digital Line Graph) vector data products. Between 1995 and 1998 the dlgv32 application was expanded to include support for viewing other USGS data products, including DRG (topographic maps) and DEM (digital elevation model) and SDTS-DLG and SDTS-DEM data products. The development process is described in detail in the USGS paper titled 'A Programming Exercise'.

In 1998 the USGS released the source code for dlgv32 v3.7 to the public domain. In 2001, the source code for dlgv32 was further developed by a private individual into the commercial product dlgv32 Pro v4.0 and offered for sale via the internet. Later that same year the product was renamed to Global Mapper and become a commercial product of the company Global Mapper Software LLC. The USGS was distributing a version of the software under the name dlgv32 Pro (Global Mapper).

On November 2, 2011 Blue Marble Geographics, at the annual user conference, announced they had purchased Global Mapper LLC.

Global Mapper Releases
Since the initial commercialization of the Global Mapper product in 2001, there have been yearly major product releases and numerous intermediate point releases adding additional functionality to the software.

A mobile version of Global Mapper, Global Mapper Mobile, was released in 2016.

References

External links
Global Mapper website

GIS companies
GIS software